The Department Store is a 1920 British silent comedy film directed by Fred Goodwins and starring Goodwins, Gerald Thorton and Andy Hagen.

Cast
 Fred Goodwins as Freddie  
 Gerald Thorton as Shopwalker
 Andy Hagen as Detective

References

Bibliography
 Quinlan, David. The Illustrated Who's Who in British Films. B.T. Batsford, 1978.

External links

1920 films
British comedy films
British silent short films
1920 comedy films
Films directed by Fred Goodwins
British black-and-white films
1920s English-language films
1920s British films
Silent comedy films